Tillberga IK Bandy, also called Tillberga Bandy Västerås or TB Västerås, is a Swedish Bandy club playing in the Allsvenskan for the first time in the 2006–07 season.   Tillberga IK were founded in 1930 and play their home games at Rocklunda.  Tillberga IK have struggled in the Allsvenskan this season finishing bottom of the Norra division and will have a difficult fight to avoid relegation during the Superallsvenskan.  Tillberga IK gained promotion in the 2005–06 season by finishing top in the Division One Norra Playoffs.

The club has been playing in the top-tier Elitserien on and off for many seasons. It did not qualify for the 2014–15 Elitserien but was then offered the vacant place there when GAIS choose to withdraw.

Squad
As of 1 January 2007:

References

External links
 Tillberga IK Official Website
 ibdb bandysidan

 
Bandy clubs in Sweden
Sport in Västmanland County
Bandy clubs established in 1930
1930 establishments in Sweden